Alexandra Chang may refer to:
 Alexandra Chang (writer), American writer
 Alexandra Chang (curator), American art curator, art historian, and editor